Ilson Wilians Rodrigues (born 12 March 1979) is a Brazilian former footballer. His previous clubs include FC Shinnik Yaroslavl and C.S. Marítimo.

References

External links
 

1979 births
Living people
Brazilian footballers
Association football defenders
Coritiba Foot Ball Club players
FC Shinnik Yaroslavl players
Londrina Esporte Clube players
C.S. Marítimo players
América Futebol Clube (SP) players
Russian Premier League players
Brazilian expatriate footballers
Expatriate footballers in Russia
Brazilian expatriate sportspeople in Russia
Expatriate footballers in Portugal
Brazilian expatriate sportspeople in Portugal